Hendrik may refer to:

People
 Hendrik (given name)
 Hans Hendrik (1832–1889), Greenlandic Arctic traveller and interpreter
 Tony Hendrik (born 1945), German music producer and composer

Others
 Hendrik Island, an island in Greenland
 Hendrik-Ido-Ambacht, a municipality in the Netherlands
 A character from Dragon Quest XI

See also
 Hendrich (disambiguation)
 Hendrick (disambiguation)
 Henrich